Rise shaving cream, introduced by Carter-Wallace in 1949, was the first to be sold in an aerosol can.   In 1963 the Federal Trade Commission charged Carter-Wallace with false advertising when a television commercial for Rise used "a phony substance resembling shaving cream."

References

Products introduced in 1949
Shaving cream brands
Carter-Wallace